Frank Jotzo is a professor at the Australian National University's Crawford School of Public Policy, Head of Energy at the ANU Institute for Climate, Energy & Disaster Solutions, Director for the ANU Zero Carbon Energy for Asia-Pacific Grand Challenge initiative and Director of the Centre for Climate Economics and Policy at Australian National University. As an environmental economist, his research focuses on policy relevant aspects of climate change, energy, and broader issues of environment, development and economic reform.

Education 
Jotzo holds a PhD and a master's degree from the ANU and an undergraduate degree from Humboldt University Berlin.

Research and advisory work 
Frank Jotzo is the joint editor-in-chief of the journal Climate Policy and a Lead Author of Intergovernmental Panel on Climate Change 6th and 5th Assessment Reports. He leads collaborative research programs including as co-director of the Energy Transition Hub, a bilateral research initiative between Australia and Germany. He has been involved in a number of policy research and advisory exercises, including as senior advisor to Australia's Garnaut Climate Change Review, advisor to Indonesia's Minister of Finance, and to the World Bank. He has advised Australian state governments including the Australian Capital Territory, Victoria and South Australia as a member of the South Australian Low Carbon Economy Experts Panel.

Jotzo also contributes to academic journalism and news. He has been listed as one of the top 50 global "influencers on renewables and future of energy". He has published more than 60 peer-reviewed journal articles as listed on Scopus, with over 13,000 citations of his work listed on Google Scholar.

Selected publications 
Gosens, J., Turnbull, A.B. and Jotzo, F., 2022. China’s decarbonization and energy security plans will reduce seaborne coal imports: Results from an installation-level model. Joule, 6(4), pp.782-815

Jotzo, F., Karplus, V., Grubb, M., Löschel, A., Neuhoff, K., Wu, L. and Teng, F. (2018), ‘China’s emissions trading takes steps towards big ambitions’, Nature Climate Change,  doi:10.1038/s41558-018-0130-0

Fankhauser, S. and Jotzo, F. (2017), Economic growth and development with low-carbon energy, WIREs Climate Change.

Bataille, C., Waisman, H., Colombier, M., Williams, J. Segafredo, L. and Jotzo, F. (2016), ‘The need for national deep decarbonization pathways (DDPs) for effective climate policy’, Climate Policy 16-S1:7-26.

Pickering, J., Jotzo, F. and Wood, P. (2015), ‘Sharing the global climate finance effort fairly with limited coordination’, Global Environmental Politics 15(4): 39-62.

Teng, F. and Jotzo, F. (2014), ‘Reaping the Economic Benefits of Decarbonization for China’ China & World Economy 22(5): 37-54.

Jotzo, F. and Löschel, A. (2014), ‘Emissions trading in China: Emerging experiences and international lessons’, Energy Policy 75: 3-8.

Pezzey, J.C.V. and Jotzo, F. (2012), ‘Tax-versus-trading and efficient revenue recycling as issues for greenhouse gas abatement’, Journal of Environmental Economics and Management 64(2): 230-236.

Jotzo, F. (2012), ‘Australia’s carbon price’, Nature Climate Change 2(7): 475–476.

Jotzo, F., Jordan, T. and Fabian, N. (2012), ‘Policy Uncertainty about Australia’s Carbon Price: Expert Survey Results and Implications for Investment’, Australian Economic Review 45(4): 395–409.

Jotzo, F. and Pezzey, J. (2007), ‘Optimal intensity targets for greenhouse emissions trading under uncertainty’, Environmental and Resource Economics, vol. 38, no. 2, pp. 259–284.

Michaelowa, A. and Jotzo, F. (2005), ‘Transaction costs, institutional rigidities and the size of the Clean Development Mechanism’, Energy Policy, vol. 33, no. 4, pp. 511–523.

Jotzo, F. and Michaelowa, A. (2002), ‘Estimating the CDM market under the Marrakech Accords’, Climate Policy, vol. 2, no. 2–3, pp. 179–201.

References 

Year of birth missing (living people)
Living people
Australian National University alumni
Academic staff of the Australian National University
Humboldt University of Berlin alumni